Markku Yli-Isotalo (9 November 1952 – 2 August 2011) was a Finnish wrestler. He competed in the men's Greco-Roman 68 kg at the 1976 Summer Olympics.

References

External links
 

1952 births
2011 deaths
Finnish male sport wrestlers
Olympic wrestlers of Finland
Wrestlers at the 1976 Summer Olympics
People from Kuortane
Sportspeople from South Ostrobothnia